The Platte River is a  river in the northwestern Lower Peninsula of Michigan. Beginning at Long Lake in Grand Traverse County, the Platte River flows west across Benzie County before ending at Platte Bay, a small bay of Lake Michigan, in the Sleeping Bear Dunes National Lakeshore.

Course 
The Platte River originates from Long Lake in Grand Traverse County flowing southwest into Lake Dubonnet, and then flowing west and eventually turning north, flowing into Mud Lake and then into Lake Ann. From the east, additional drainage into Lake Ann comes from Ransom Creek, which drains Ransom Lake, and in turn Bellows Lake and Lyons Lake.  From Lake Ann, the Platte River runs west and south. It collects the outflow of Upper and Lower Woodcock Lakes then flows through Bronson Lake. The river continues southwest. The Platte River State Fish Hatchery is on the river at the eponymous community Platte River and Brundage Creek joins the river just to the east. The main branch receives Collison Creek just east of Honor, Michigan. At the Platte River Campground in the state forest, the river turns north west flowing toward Platte Lake.

The north branch of the Platte River receives the outflow of Little Platte Lake shortly before joining the main branch just before the combined flow enters Big Platte Lake.

The lower part of the Platte River begins as the outflow of Platte Lake, south of Empire, Michigan. It runs generally northwest, widening into Loon Lake about a third of the way through its course from Platte Lake.  Its mouth is at Platte Bay of Lake Michigan at Platte River Point. Mud Lake is a tributary upstream of Loon Lake.

The river above Platte Lake tends to be much swifter and colder than the lower stretch, which is warmed considerably by it passage through the relatively shallow,  stretch of Platte Lake.

There are three boat launches, a canoe launch and three picnic areas on the river in the national lakeshore.

Drainage basin 
The Platte River drains the following municipalities (italicized municipalities are those which the river drains but does not flow through):

 Benzie County
 Almira Township
 Benzonia Township
 Colfax Township
 Homestead Township
 Inland Township
 Lake Township
 Platte Township
 Grand Traverse County
 Garfield Township
 Green Lake Township
 Long Lake Township
 Leelanau County
 Elmwood Township
 Empire Township
 Kasson Township
 Solon Township

References

External links
National Park Service map
Platte River watershed plan

Rivers of Michigan
Rivers of Benzie County, Michigan
Rivers of Grand Traverse County, Michigan
Tributaries of Lake Michigan